Mark John Docherty (born 15 May 1988) is a Scottish footballer who plays as a defender for Forfar Athletic, on loan from Edinburgh City. Docherty, who started his career with St Mirren, has since played for Stirling Albion, Brechin City, Alloa Athletic (twice), Stranraer, Dumbarton, East Fife, Montrose, Forfar Athletic, Annan Athletic (twice) and Clyde.

Career
Born in Bellshill, Docherty began his career with St Mirren and had a loan spell with Montrose in 2007. He made his St Mirren début coming on as a substitute in the 2–0 win over Gretna on 29 March 2008.

He joined Stirling Albion in August 2008, but was released at the end of the 2008–09 season. He then joined Brechin City on a short-term contract and in January 2010 his deal with the club was extended by a further 18-months. On 31 January 2011, he moved to Annan Athletic on loan until the end of the 2010–11 season.

Docherty joined Alloa Athletic in July 2011, helping the club to consecutive promotions before being released in May 2013. He then signed for Stranraer in the summer of 2013. On 29 May 2014, Docherty rejoined Alloa Athletic.

Docherty joined Scottish Championship side Dumbarton in June 2015. He scored his first goal for the club direct from a corner against former club Alloa His second also came direct from a corner in a 1–0 win over Livingston. He renewed his contract in June 2016 for another season He scored the winner from the penalty spot in a 1–0 victory over Dundee United for the Sons in August 2016, his third penalty conversion for the club in two games. He left the club in May 2017

After leaving Dumbarton, Docherty subsequently signed for Scottish League One club East Fife on 13 June 2017. After making over fifty appearances for East Fife, Docherty signed a two-year deal with Forfar Athletic in May 2019. Docherty was released by Forfar in January 2020 and moved to Annan Athletic. He joined Clyde in the summer of 2021, playing 33 times before leaving the club after one season.

Career statistics

References

External links

Living people
1988 births
Footballers from Bellshill
Scottish footballers
Association football midfielders
Scottish Football League players
St Mirren F.C. players
Montrose F.C. players
Dumbarton F.C. players
Stirling Albion F.C. players
Brechin City F.C. players
Annan Athletic F.C. players
Alloa Athletic F.C. players
Stranraer F.C. players
East Fife F.C. players
Forfar Athletic F.C. players
Scottish Professional Football League players
Clyde F.C. players
F.C. Edinburgh players